HTC Smart (F3188 aka HTC Rome 100) is a budget smartphone produced by HTC Corporation. It is based on Qualcomm's BREW mobile operating system. HTC Smart was officially announced on January 7, 2010 and was released on March 15, 2010 in Europe and Asia.

See also
 Comparison of smartphones

References

External links
HTC Smart Homepage
Price Comparison

HTC smartphones